Joseph Tonks (26 October 1872 – 1951) was an English footballer who played in the Football League for Wolverhampton Wanderers. Tonks was a member of the Wolves team which lost 2–1 to The Wednesday in the 1896 FA Cup Final.

References

1872 births
1951 deaths
English footballers
Association football forwards
English Football League players
Walsall F.C. players
Wolverhampton Wanderers F.C. players
FA Cup Final players